"Telepatía" (stylized in all lowercase) is a song by American singer Kali Uchis. Originally released on November 18, 2020 as part of her second studio album Sin Miedo (del Amor y Otros Demonios), it became the album's third single on February 26, 2021, after gaining prominence on the social media platform TikTok. Uchis drew inspiration from telepathy and being able to spiritually communicate with someone whom she could not be with.

Unlike her debut studio album, Isolation (2018),  initially failed to enter any national charts. However, the viral success of "Telepatía" helped launch the album onto the Billboard 200 for the first time. The song went on to win Favorite Latin Song at the 2021 American Music Awards.

The song was sent to contemporary hit radio in the United States on April 6, 2021.

Composition
"Telepatía" is a song about a long-distance relationship that sees Uchis sing in Spanish about making love to her partner telepathically while they are apart. Additionally, the lyrics are notably gender neutral, and the song could be construed as Uchis referring to a person of any gender, seemingly as per Uchis's bisexuality.

Critical reception
"Telepatía" ranked as the fifth best song of 2021 by Billboard, stating that "not only essential for its addictive groove and inspired lyrical content, the pop gem also put a spotlight on truly bilingual songs having chart potential."

Music video
On March 18, 2021 the official music video for "Telepatía" was released. It sees Uchis stroll around her hometown of Pereira, Colombia and was directed by the artist herself. For the video, Kali Uchis said she wanted "Nothing overproduced, just the beautiful natural magic of the country I have had the honor of also calling home my entire life, Colombia."

Track listing
Telepatía (acoustic) – Single
"Telepatía" (acoustic) – 2:58

Charts

Weekly charts

Year-end charts

Certifications

Release history

See also
 List of Billboard number-one Latin songs of 2021

Further reading
 https://www.billboard.com/amp/articles/columns/latin/9575275/kali-uchis-earns-first-hot-latin-songs-chart-no-1-with-telepatia

References

2021 singles
2020 songs
Kali Uchis songs
EMI Records singles
Interscope Records singles
Spanglish songs
Number-one singles in Mexico
Song recordings produced by Tainy
Songs written by Kali Uchis
Songs written by Tainy